Austro-Hungarian gulden coins were minted following the Ausgleich with different designs for the two parts of the empire.

Coins of Hungary

Notes 

 "MAGYAR KIRÁLYI VÁLTÓ PÉNZ" = "Hungarian Royal token coin"
 "FERENCZ JÓZSEF A. CSÁSZÁR MAGYARORSZÁG AP. KIRÁLYA" = "Ferencz József ausztriai császár Magyarország apostoli királya" = "Franz Joseph Austrian Emperor Apostolic King of Hungary
 "VÁLTÓ PÉNZ" = "token coin"
 "FERENCZ JÓZSEF I.K.A.CS. ÉS M.H.S.D.O.AP.KIR." = "Ferencz József Isten kegyelméből ausztriai császár és Magyar-, Horvát-, Szlavon-, Dalmátországok apostoli királya" = "Franz Joseph by the Grace of God Emperor of Austria and Apostolic King of Hungary, Croatia, Slavonia, Dalmatia"
 "BIZALMAM AZ ŐSI ERÉNYBEN" = "My trust in the ancient virtue"
 "FERENCZ JÓZSEF A. CSÁSZÁR" = "Ferencz József ausztriai császár" = "Franz Joseph Austrian Emperor"
 "MAGYAR ORSZÁG AP. KIRÁLYA" = "Magyar ország apostoli királya" = "Apostolic King of Hungary"
 "MAGYAR KIRÁLYSÁG" = "Hungarian Kingdom"
 "FERENCZ J. A. CSÁSZÁR" = "Ferencz József ausztriai császár" = "Franz Joseph Austrian Emperor"

References

Further reading

in Hungarian

in German
 

Austro-Hungarian